Rolf Michel (born January 21, 1945 in Tambach-Dietharz) is a German physicist. He studied physics at the University of Cologne and became in 1984 Professor for Radiation Protection at the Leibniz-University Hanover.

From 1999 till 2006 he was member of the German Commission on Radiological Protection (SSK). In 2008 he became again a member of the German Commission on Radiological Protection and was appointed as chairman. From 2008 to 2009 he was the President of the German-Swiss Radiation Protection Association.

He worked mainly in the fields of nuclear chemistry, radioanalytic, production of radionuclides in nuclear reactions, interaction of cosmic ray with materie and radioecology.

Sources
Strahlenschutzpraxis, Heft 1/2008, S. 96-100

External links
Centre of Radiation Protection and Radioecology
German-Swiss Radiation Protection Association
 German Commission on Radiological Protection 

German nuclear physicists
Living people
1945 births